Tom Henning Strannegård (born 29 April 2001) is a Swedish footballer currently playing as a midfielder for Start.

Career statistics

Club

Notes

References

External links
 
 
 
 

2002 births
Living people
Swedish footballers
Swedish expatriate footballers
AIK Fotboll players
Vasalunds IF players
IK Start players
Association football midfielders
Allsvenskan players
Superettan players
Norwegian First Division players
Sweden youth international footballers
Expatriate footballers in Norway
Swedish expatriate sportspeople in Norway
Footballers from Stockholm
21st-century Swedish people